The year 1915 was marked, in science fiction, by the following events.

Births and deaths

Births 
 April 7 : Henry Kuttner, American writer (died 1958)
 June 24 : Fred Hoyle, American writer and astronomer (died 2001)
 August 24 : James Tiptree, Jr., American writer (died 1987)
 November 6 : David I. Masson, Scottish writer (died 2007)
 November 15 : Raymond F. Jones, American writer (died 1994)
 December 7 : Leigh Brackett, American writer (died 1978)
 December 29 : Charles L. Harness, American writer (died 2005)

Deaths 
 October 15 : Paul Scheerbart, German writer (born 1863)

Events

Awards 
The main science-fiction Awards known at the present time did not exist at this time.

Literary releases

Novels

Stories collections

Short stories

Comics

Audiovisual outputs

Movies

See also 
 1915 in science
 1914 in science fiction
 1916 in science fiction

References

science-fiction
Science fiction by year